Chapman, also known as Chapman Woods is a neighborhood in Pasadena, California. It is bordered by Del Mar Boulevard to the north, Huntington Drive to the south, the Eaton Wash to the west, and Highway 19 (Rosemead Boulevard) to the east.
Chapman is an anomaly in that part of the neighborhood is in incorporated Pasadena while part is in unincorporated Los Angeles County. The region is named after Alfred Chapman who purchased the surrounding land and built his home on the corner of present-day California Boulevard and Ivydale Court.

Landmarks
There is heavy commercial development on Foothill Boulevard, Colorado Boulevard, and Highway 19. The central feature of the neighborhood is Willard Elementary School and Wilson Middle School, which face each other across Madre Street. All entrances into the neighborhood are signed with signs that says "Chapman Woods".

Education
Chapman is served by Willard Elementary School, Wilson Middle School and Pasadena High School in the Pasadena Unified School District.

Transportation
The Metro Gold Line has a terminal complex on Sierra Madre Villa Avenue and Foothill Boulevard. The neighborhood overall is served by Metro Local lines 266 and 267; Pasadena Transit routes 31, 32, 40 and 60; and Foothill Transit Route 187.

References

Neighborhoods in Pasadena, California